The Desperate Game is a 1926 American silent Western film directed by Joseph Franz and Milburn Morante.  It stars Pete Morrison, Lew Meehan, and Bert Lindley.

Cast
 Pete Morrison as Jim Wesley 
 Dolores Gardner as Marguerite Grayson 
 Jim Welch as Mr. Wesley - Jim's Father
 Jere Austin as Mel Larrimer 
 J.P. Lockney as Adam Grayson 
 Al Richmond as Montana McGraw 
 Virginia Warwick as Belle Deane 
 Lew Meehan as Bat Grayson 
 Milburn Morante as Shinney 
 Merrill McCormick as Luke Grayson 
 Bert Lindley as Pat Davis

References

External links

 
 
 

1926 films
1926 Western (genre) films
Universal Pictures films
Films directed by Milburn Morante
American black-and-white films
Films directed by Joseph Franz
Silent American Western (genre) films
1920s English-language films
1920s American films